Baby Be Mine may refer to:

 "Baby Be Mine" (Blackstreet song), 1993
 "Baby Be Mine" (Michael Jackson song), 1982
 "Baby, Be Mine" (Miki Howard song), 1987
 "Baby Be Mine", a 2011 song by The Parlotones on Eavesdropping on the Songs of Whales